Several Swedish Princes have been named Gustaf. This list does not include those who eventually became Kings of Sweden.

 Gustaf Gustafsson of Vasa, later known as Gustaf Gustafsson of Vasa (1799-1877)
 Prince Gustaf, Duke of Uppland (1827-1852) (The Singer Prince)